Johann Karl, Count Chotek of Chotkow and Wognin (29 October 17048 November 1787) was a Bohemian-Austrian chancellor.

Life
Johann Karl was born at Prague, Kingdom of Bohemia as the elder son of Count Wenzel Chotek of Chotkow and Wognin (1674–1754) and Maria Theresa Scheidler of Scheidlen (1684–1709). He came of an old Bohemian noble family, with residence in Choczkow at Radnice (Plzeň Region). His father held the position of Austrian Stadtholder of the Kingdom of Bohemia from 1735–1738.

He was Imperial Governor and field-marshal of the Upper Palatinate. Then he was a Bohemian-Austrian Imperial Director and chancellor

In 1753, Empress Maria Theresa gave him the Palais Strozzi in the Josefstadt (Vienna), he ordered the building of a new wing. Further expansion plans and the Seven Years' War, however, forced him to sell large part of the garden.

He was a Knight of St. Wenzel Order.

Marriage and family
Johan Karl married on 25 May 1740 in Vienna to Countess Anna Maria Kottulinsky of Kottulin and Krzizkowitz (1711–1798), youngest child of Count Franz Carl Kottulinsky of Kottulin and Krizkowitz, and his wife, Countess Maria Antonia of Rottal.

They had one son:
Johann Rudolf, Count Chotek of Chotkow and Wognin (18 May 1748 – 26 August 1824), married in 1772 to Countess Maria Sidonia of Clary and Aldringen; had issue.

Ancestry

Notes and sources
Genealogisches Handbuch erloschener böhmischer Herrenstandsfamilien Neustadt an der Aisch, 1973, Procházka, Roman Freiherr von, Reference: 57
Genealogisches Handbuch des Adels, Fürstliche Häuser, Reference: 1956 547
Baron Roman Prochazka : Genealogical Handbook extinct Mr. Bohemian-class families. Degener & Co, Neustadt (Aisch) 1973, S. 57. Degener & Co, Neustadt (Aisch) 1973, p. 57
Heribert Sturm (eds.): Biographical Dictionary of the history of Bohemia. Band 1: A - H . Oldenbourg, München 1974, S. 197. Volume 1:. A - H Oldenbourg, Munich 1974, p. 197
Ivo Cerman: Chotkove. Pribeh urednicke slechty. Lidove noviny, Prag 2008, .

1704 births
1787 deaths
Johann Karl
Politicians from Prague